The Vancouver Warriors are a professional box lacrosse team in the National Lacrosse League. The team moved from Everett, Washington, for the 2014 NLL season.

History
The Warriors are based in Vancouver, British Columbia, and play at Rogers Arena, home of the Vancouver Canucks of the NHL. From the 2014 season to the 2017–18 season the Warriors (then known as the Stealth) played at the Langley Events Centre (LEC) in the Vancouver suburb of Langley, British Columbia. The team officially relocated into the city after being sold in 2018 to Canucks Sports & Entertainment, who announced that they would be rebranding the team. On September 21, 2018, the team unveiled their new logo and announced that their new name would be the Vancouver Warriors.

The franchise began as the Albany Attack which played from 2000 until 2003. The franchise adopted the Stealth nickname upon its move to San Jose in 2004. The team kept the name following their subsequent moves to Everett in 2010 and Vancouver in 2014. The Stealth won the Champion's Cup in 2010 while playing as the Washington Stealth. In 2017, the Vancouver Stealth qualified for the NLL Playoffs for the first time since 2013.

Current roster

Awards and honours

Hall of Fame members

 Chris Hall, Class of 2014

All-time record

Playoff results

Head coaching history
Note: This list does not include coaches from the San Jose Stealth or the Washington Stealth or the Albany Attack.

Draft history

NLL Entry Draft 
First Round Selections

 2013: Cody Bremner (8th overall)
 2014: None
 2015: None
 2016: None
 2017: None
 2018: None
 2019: None
 2020: Reid Bowering (2nd overall)
 2021: Adam Charalambides (4th overall) 
 2022: Owen Grant (3rd overall)

References
Notes

Sources
NLL press release announcing the move
Stealth press release announcing the move

External links
 Official Website

 
National Lacrosse League teams
Sports teams in Vancouver
Lacrosse clubs established in 2014
Lacrosse teams in British Columbia
2014 establishments in British Columbia